Aslauga imitans, the imitating aslauga, is a butterfly in the family Lycaenidae. It is found in Ghana (the Volta Region), western Cameroon and the Democratic Republic of the Congo (the Pania Forest).

References

External links
Images representing Aslauga imitans at Barcodes of Life

Butterflies described in 1994
Aslauga